The Wonky Donkey is a 2009 children's book by New Zealander Craig Smith. It is illustrated by British-born Katz Cowley, who has a degree in Illustration from the University of Northumbria.

The book is based upon a song that Smith wrote in 2005 after hearing the joke: "What do you call a donkey with three legs? – A wonky donkey". In 2018 the book was featured in a viral video of a Scottish grandmother laughing hysterically as she attempted to read it to her grandchild, leading to a surge in purchases of the book worldwide.

Awards
 Children's Choice Award by the New Zealand Post Children's Book Awards
 The song was the APRA New Zealand Children's Song of the Year Award in 2008.

Controversy
In 2010 a schoolteacher alleged that Smith had heavily based the book on several internet jokes and had not referenced this in his work. Smith and his publisher responded by stating that the song predated the specific versions that the educator had seen on the internet and that it was possible that these versions had emerged because of his success with the song and resulting book.

References

External links

 
The Wonky Donkey Book website
Katz Cowley website

2009 children's books
New Zealand children's books
Scholastic Corporation books
Fictional donkeys